The Deutsche Reichsbahn's Class 52 is a German steam locomotive built in large numbers during the Second World War. It was the most produced type of the so-called Kriegslokomotiven or Kriegsloks (war locomotives). The Class 52 was a wartime development of the pre-war DRG Class 50, using fewer parts and less expensive materials to speed production. They were designed by Richard Wagner who was Chief Engineer of the Central Design Office at the Locomotive Standards Bureau of the DRG. About a dozen classes of locomotive were referred to as Kriegslokomotiven; however, the three main classes were the Class 52, 50 and 42. They were numbered 52 1-52 7794. A total of 20 are preserved in Germany.

Many locomotives passed into Russian ownership after the Second World War. In the USSR, the class were designated TE (TЭ). Other operators of the type included Poland, Romania, Bulgaria, Norway and Turkey, among others.

Design
The Class 52 was a simplified version of the prewar Reichsbahn class 50 locomotive (produced 1938–1942). The simplified design of the class 52 was intended to reduce the man-hours and skills needed to manufacture it and to adapt to wartime shortages of strategic materials. Additional design changes gave the locomotives and their crew better protection against the cold. Between 1942 and the end of the war in May 1945, over 6,300 Class 52 locomotives were built. Additional locomotives were built post-war, giving a class total of probably 6719 units, delivered by seventeen manufacturers. The Class 42 was a larger version of the Class 52, but was produced in smaller numbers.

Wagner had wanted locomotives which were long-lasting and easy to maintain, and unlike British engineers did not consider a high power-to-weight ratio a priority. The Class 52 could haul  at  without significant strain. On a 3% grade they could haul 800 tons at 5 km/h.

Manufacture 
Over 7,794 locomotives of  DRB Class 52 type were built across Europe for use on the Eastern Front during the Second World War. Thus it was one of the most numerous steam locomotives in the world. To achieve such numbers, the German locomotive manufacturers were merged into the 'Community of Greater German Locomotive Manufacturers', Gemeinschaft Grossdeutscher Lokomotivhersteller (GGL), which was a subdivision of the 'Rail Vehicles Main Committee', Hauptausschuss Schienenfahrzeuge (HAS) founded in 1942. Key HAS figures were the Reichsminister for munition and armament, Albert Speer and the Reich transport minister, Julius Dorpmüller.

Following the invasion of Poland in September 1939 Nazi Germany disbanded the Polish State Railways (PKP). Polish rail officials were either executed in mass shootings or imprisoned, and some 8,000 managerial positions were staffed with German officials. Former Polish companies began producing German engines BR44, BR50 and BR86 as early as 1940, some using forced labor. By 1944, the factories in Poznań and Chrzanów were producing the redesigned Kriegslok BR52 locomotives for the Eastern Front. These locomotives were made almost entirely of steel; the use of more expensive, non-ferrous metals was dropped in view of the engines' expected lifespan.

The GGL included the following locomotive manufacturers (including an approximate number of Class 52s produced):

 LOFAG, Vienna: 1,053 units
 Henschel, Kassel (Henschel Flugzeugwerke AG): 1,050 units (forced labor)
 Schwartzkopff, Berlin: 647 units
 Krauss-Maffei, Munich: 613 units
 Borsig, Berlin; branches: Borsig-Rheinmetall AG Düsseldorf (in Siemianowice, Poland), Borsig Lokomotivwerke Hennigsdorf, Borsig Werke Breslau-Hundsfeld (now Wrocław-Psie Pole, Poland): 542 units (forced labor, incl. KL Auschwitz)
 Schichau-Werke Elbing (now Elbląg, Poland): 505 units (forced labor, incl. KZ Stutthof, and its subcamps).
 Maschinenbau und Bahnbedarfs AG (MBA) formerly Orenstein & Koppel, Babelsberg: 400 units
 DWM Posen, Poznań (occupied Poland), German takeover of Polish manufacturer H. Cegielski – Poznań: 314 units (forced labor)
 Oberschlesische Lokfabrik Krenau, Chrzanów (occupied Poland), German takeover of Polish manufacturer Fablok: 264 units (forced labor)
 Maschinenfabrik Esslingen: 250 units
 Jung, Jungenthal, Kirchen: 231 units
 Škoda Works, Pilsen: 153 units
 Grafenstaden, Strasbourg: 139 units

Post-war use 
In the early postwar years, Class 52s were used by many European countries. Western European countries replaced them with more modern locomotives as soon as possible, with the exception of Austria where they were used until 1976. The simplicity and effectiveness, plus the large production total, meant that many eastern European countries were slow to withdraw their Kriegslokomotiven. Poland used them into the 1990s; some in Bosnia continued in use until at least the late 2010s.

Belgium, SNCB Type 26 - 100 locomotives originally ordered by the DRG during the occupation but not completed until after liberation.
Bosnia - some still in industrial service in Bosnia in late 2017.
Bulgaria, Bulgarian State Railways class 15 - over 150 locomotives numbered 15.01-1650 .
Czechoslovakia, ČSD class 555.0 - Some rebuilt as Class 555.3 to burn mazut fuel oil, a large surplus of which was generated in synthetic fuel plants in occupied Czechoslovakia from brown coal. The 555.3 differed visibly by having a lid on the smokestack to slow down cooling of the lining of the flue passage, to prevent cracking.
East Germany - around 800 locomotives. 200 rebuilt as DR Class 52.80.
Hungary, MÁV class 520 - 100 locomotives acquired from the Soviet Union in 1963 and used into the 1980s.
Norway, NSB class 63 - 74 locomotives sent during the German occupation and seized post-war. Nicknamed Stortysker ("big German"). One engine, restored by the Norwegian Railway Club, is preserved at the Norwegian Railway Museum in Hamar.
Poland, PKP class Ty2 – 1,200 locomotives after the end of the war, a further 200 acquired from the Soviet Union in 1962–64. Began to be phased out in the 1980s; its last regular use was in 1999.
Romania, Romanian State Railways class 150.1000 - about 100 locomotives.
Soviet Union, Class TE (from Trophy, equivalent to E-class) - over 2,100 locomotives captured or seized.
Turkey, TCDD class 56501  – 10 locomotives purchased from Germany in 1943, a further 43 loaned from Germany in 1943-44, which were permamently seized when Turkey declared war on Germany.
Yugoslavia, Yugoslav Railways JŽ 33'

Gallery 
Several Class 52s have been preserved in operating condition. One is at the Nene Valley Railway in Peterborough, England. Another one is in service with the Franconian Museum Railway in Bavaria, Germany.

Notes

See also
 The Museum of the Moscow Railway, at Paveletsky Rail Terminal, Moscow
 Rizhsky Rail Terminal, Moscow, Home of the Moscow Railway Museum
 History of rail transport in Russia
 List of railway museums (worldwide)
 Russian Railway Museum, Saint Petersburg

References

External links 

 The German Class 52 Locomotive
 DRB 52 8134 under way, winter 2012.

52
2-10-0 locomotives
52
Floridsdorf locomotives
Henschel locomotives
Berliner locomotives
Krauss-Maffei locomotives
Borsig locomotives
Esslingen locomotives
Arnold Jung locomotives
Škoda locomotives
Class 63
Steam locomotives of Norway
Steam locomotives of Austria
Railway locomotives introduced in 1942
Freight locomotives
Standard gauge locomotives of Germany
Standard gauge locomotives of Norway
Standard gauge locomotives of Austria
Standard gauge locomotives of Czechoslovakia
Standard gauge locomotives of Hungary
Standard gauge locomotives of Yugoslavia
5 ft gauge locomotives
1′E h2 locomotives
Schichau-Werke locomotives